Crazy Bird is an indoor steel roller coaster at Happy Valley Tianjin, an amusement park in Dongli District, Tianjin, China. The coaster has the steepest drop of any roller coaster in the world.

Overview and features
Built by S&S – Sansei Technologies, Crazy Bird is one of six "El Loco" model roller coasters in the world. It is also an indoor coaster, and has been cited by Funworld Magazine as an example of the increased prevalence of indoor coasters that occur in Asia versus coasters on other continents. Funworld Magazine argued that this is due to climatic factors involving the rainy season in much of Asia. The coaster has occasionally been marketed to take advantage of the Angry Birds franchise (the Chinese characters "愤怒" mean angry and not crazy), but the theming for the coaster does not fit the Angry Birds style.

Crazy Bird is most notable for the steeper-than-vertical (120-degree) drop on its first hill, giving the coaster one of the steepest first drops in the world. The coaster also has sharply banked turns, as well as two inversions (a dive loop and an inline twist). Park guests ride the coaster in individual 4-seat cars which have onboard speakers. Crazy Bird is the only El Loco coaster in Asia.

Incidents
Park staff failed to restart the train and the riders were forced to exit on foot. Reports indicated that a similar event had occurred in early April of the same year.

Reviews
Theme Park Investigator identified the coaster as number 5 in the top 5 most anticipated roller coasters for 2013.

References